Joseph Force Crater (January 5, 1889 – disappeared August 6, 1930; declared legally dead June 6, 1939) was a New York State Supreme Court Justice who mysteriously vanished amid a political scandal. He was last seen leaving a restaurant on West 45th Street in Manhattan and entered popular culture as one of the most mysterious missing persons cases of the 20th century. Despite massive publicity, the case was never solved and was officially closed forty years after Crater disappeared.

Early life and legal career
Joseph Crater was born in Easton, Pennsylvania, the eldest of four children of Frank Ellsworth Crater and the former Leila Virginia Montague. Crater was educated at Lafayette College (class of 1910) and Columbia University. He was a member of the Sigma Chi fraternity. During his time at Columbia, Crater met Stella Mance Wheeler, who was at the time married, and helped her get a divorce. The pair married shortly thereafter in spring 1917.

Crater's official title was Justice of the New York Supreme Court for New York County, which is a trial court despite the designation "supreme" (New York State's highest court is the Court of Appeals). He issued two published opinions: Rotkowitz v. Sohn, involving fraudulent conveyances and mortgage foreclosure fraud; and Henderson v. Park Central Motors Service, dealing with a garage company's liability for an expensive car stolen and wrecked by an ex-convict.

Disappearance
In the summer of 1930, after the start of the first investigations of what would become the Seabury Commission, Crater and his wife were vacationing at their summer cabin in Belgrade, Maine. In late July, Crater received a telephone call. He offered no information to his wife about the content of the call other than to say that he had to return to New York City "to straighten those fellows out". The next day, he arrived at his apartment at 40 Fifth Avenue, Greenwich Village, but instead of dealing with business he proceeded onward to Atlantic City, New Jersey, with his mistress, showgirl Sally Lou Ritz (real name, Sarah Ritzi; 1907/1908–2000).

Crater returned to Maine on August 1 and traveled back to New York on August 3. Before making this final trip, he promised his wife that he would return by her birthday on August 9. Stella stated that he was in good spirits and behaving normally when he departed for the city. On the morning of August 6, Crater spent two hours going through his files in his chambers, reportedly destroying several documents. He then had his law clerk, Joseph Mara, cash two checks for him that amounted to US$5,150 (equivalent to about US$ in ). At noon, Crater and Mara carried two locked briefcases to Crater's apartment, where Mara was told to take the rest of the day off.

Later that evening, Crater went to a Broadway ticket agency, Supreme Tickets, and bought one seat from William Deutsch, the proprietor of Supreme, for a comedy called Dancing Partner at the Belasco Theatre. He then went to Billy Haas's Chophouse at 332 West 45th Street, where he ate dinner with Ritz and William Klein, a lawyer friend.

Last known sighting
Crater's dinner companions gave differing accounts of his departure from the restaurant. Klein initially testified that "the judge got into a taxicab outside the restaurant about 9:30 p.m. and drove west on Forty-fifth Street." This account was initially confirmed by Ritz: "At the sidewalk Judge Crater took a taxicab." Klein and Ritz later changed their story and said that they had entered a taxi outside the restaurant, but that Crater had walked down the street.

Delayed responses to disappearance
Crater's disappearance did not elicit any immediate reaction. When he did not return to Maine after ten days, his wife began making calls to their friends in New York, asking whether anyone had seen him. Only when Crater failed to appear for the opening of the courts on August 25 did his fellow justices become alarmed. They started a private investigation but failed to find any trace of him. The police were finally notified on September 3, and after that the missing judge was front-page news.

Investigation
Once an official investigation was launched, the case received widespread publicity. Detectives discovered that the judge's safe deposit box had been emptied and the two briefcases that Crater and Mara had taken to his apartment were missing. These promising leads were quickly lost amid the thousands of false reports from people claiming to have seen the missing justice.

Sally Lou Ritz, June Brice, and Vivian Gordon
Crater enjoyed the city's nightlife and had been involved with several women. In the aftermath of the case, two of the women he had been involved with left town abruptly and a third was murdered. Sally Lou Ritz, the showgirl who had dined with Crater the evening that he vanished, left New York in August or September 1930. She was found in late September 1930, living in Youngstown, Ohio, with her parents. Ritz said that she had left the city suddenly because she had received word that her father was ill. She was still being subjected to interviews by police investigating the Crater case in 1937, by which time she was living in Beverly Hills, California.

Showgirl June Brice had been seen talking to Crater the day before he disappeared. A lawyer acting for Crater's wife believed that Brice had been at the center of a scheme to blackmail Crater (thus explaining why he had taken cash out of the bank) and that a gangster boyfriend of Brice had killed the justice. Brice disappeared the day that a grand jury was to convene on the case. In 1948, she was discovered in a mental hospital.

Vivian Gordon, a third woman, was involved in high-end prostitution and linked to madam Polly Adler. Gordon had liaisons with a large number of influential businesspeople, and was the owner, on paper at least, of a number of properties believed to be fronts for illegal activity. She was also seen around town with gangster Jack "Legs" Diamond, with whom Crater was rumored to socialize. Crater had known Diamond's former boss, organized crime figure Arnold Rothstein, and had been extremely upset at Rothstein's murder.

On February 20, 1931, Gordon was angry about a conviction that had resulted in her losing custody of her 16-year-old daughter. She met the head of an official inquiry into city government corruption (launched in the wake of Crater's disappearance) and offered to testify about police graft. She was murdered five days later. The publicity surrounding Gordon's killing led to the resignation of a policeman whom she had accused of framing her, and the suicide of her daughter. 

Tammany Hall's hold on the city was largely eliminated in the ensuing scandal, as it had already been weakened by Rothstein and the conflict over his former empire. The scandal also led to the resignation of Mayor Jimmy Walker.

Open verdict
In October, a grand jury began examining the Crater case, calling 95 witnesses and amassing 975 pages of testimony. Crater's wife refused to appear. The conclusion was that "the evidence is insufficient to warrant any expression of opinion as to whether Crater is alive or dead, or as to whether he has absented himself voluntarily, or is the sufferer from disease in the nature of amnesia, or is the victim of crime".

On January 20, 1931, six months after his disappearance, Crater's wife found envelopes containing checks, stocks, bonds, and a note from the justice in a dresser drawer which had been empty when searched earlier by police. The discovery led to new but ultimately inconclusive leads, and no further trace of Crater was ever found. The case was officially closed in 1979.

Mrs. Crater
Crater met Stella Mance Wheeler in 1917 when he served as her divorce lawyer, and they married seven days after her divorce was finalized. Mrs. Crater remained at their vacation home in Maine during the search for her husband, until her discovery of the hidden envelopes. Without Crater's income, Mrs. Crater was unable to maintain the couple's Fifth Avenue apartment and was evicted. She petitioned to have the justice declared officially dead in July 1937; she was reportedly living on the $12 per week (approximately $239.26 in 2022) that she earned as a telephone operator in Maine.

Mrs. Crater married Carl Kunz, a New York City electrical contractor, in Elkton, Maryland, on April 23, 1938. Kunz's first wife had hanged herself only eight days before the wedding. Crater was finally declared legally dead in 1939 thanks to Mrs. Crater's lawyer, noted New York attorney Emil K. Ellis. She received $20,561 in life insurance (approximately $430,751.46 adjusted for 2022). Mrs. Crater separated from Kunz in 1950 and died in 1969 at age 70.

Mrs. Crater expressed her belief that her husband had been murdered in her own account of the case, The Empty Robe, which was written with freelance writer and journalist Oscar Fraley and published by Doubleday in 1961.

Later information
On August 19, 2005, authorities revealed that after Queens resident Stella Ferrucci-Good's death at age 91, they had received notes she wrote in which she claimed that her husband, NYPD detective Robert Good, had learned that Crater was killed by Charles Burns, an NYPD officer who also worked as a bodyguard of Murder, Inc. enforcer Abe Reles, and by Burns' brother, Frank. According to the letter, Crater was buried near West Eighth Street in Coney Island, Brooklyn, at the current site of the New York Aquarium. Police reported that no records had been found to indicate that skeletal remains had been discovered at that site when it was excavated in the 1950s. Richard J. Tofel, the author of Vanishing Point: The Disappearance of Judge Crater and the New York He Left Behind, expressed skepticism of Ferrucci-Good's account.

Popular culture
The phrase "to pull a Judge Crater", or simply "to pull a Crater", means to disappear. It is no longer widely used. For many years following Crater's disappearance, "Judge Crater, call your office" was a standard gag of nightclub comedians.

Crater has been referenced in several TV shows:
In the M*A*S*H episode "Bless You, Hawkeye," Colonel Potter says the keys to the lab have been "pulling a Judge Crater."
In the Green Acres episode "Not Guilty," Mr. Haney, speaking to his bloodhound, says "Come on, Clarence. Let's see if we can pick up on Judge Crater's trail again." Eb responds, "Who's Judge, uh-" followed by Oliver's, "Never mind."
Crater is portrayed on the television series Night Gallery in the season 3 episode "Rare Objects", being among several other presumed dead people in a living zoo-like collection.
In the Dick Van Dyke Show episode "Very Old Shoes, Very Old Rice," the judge performing Rob and Laura Petrie's wedding ceremony is named Judge Krata. Rob misunderstands him to say he was Judge Crater and questions the judge, who makes a joke about the similarities of their names.
In the Golden Girls episode "Job Hunting," when Rose asks the girls to guess what she finds in the refrigerator, Dorothy answers, "Judge Crater."
In the Designing Women episode "Getting Married and Eating Dirt," Julia Sugarbaker jokes that Elvis Presley "is probably on a houseboat in Brazil with Judge Crater and Laika the Russian space dog."
In the Archer episode "Skytanic," ISIS head Malory Archer complains about the missing bartender, "Guy sees an empty glass and all of a sudden he's Judge Crater."
In Season 5, Episode 5 of CSI: NY, ""The Cost of Living", a fictional archeologist, the victim in the episode, is purported to be searching for Judge Crater's remains, near where President Roosevelt stayed when in NYC, based on finding Judge Crater's watch.
In Season 1, Episode 6 of Star Trek: Enterprise, "Terra Nova", Ensign Travis Mayweather compares Judge Crater with Amelia Earhart during the final scenes.

Stephen King's story "The Reaper's Image" blames Judge Crater's disappearance on a cursed mirror.

As a publicity stunt for their 1933 film Bureau of Missing Persons, First National Pictures promised in advertisements to pay Crater $10,000 if he claimed it in person at the box office.

Crater's last letter, possibly written on the day of his disappearance, was sold at auction on June 22, 1981, for $700. The letter was marked "confidential" and began: "The following money is due me from the persons named. Get in touch with them for they will surely pay their debts." It was incorrectly reported that this letter was Crater's will.

See also

 List of people who disappeared

References

Further reading

External links
Judge Crater Disappearance Possibly Solved; Aug. 19, 2005; Fox News
Judge Crater, is that you?; Aug. 19, 2005; MSNBC (includes video)
JUDGE CRATER FOUND? Dead gal's secret letter may solve 1930 mystery; Aug. 19, 2005; New York Post

1889 births
1930 deaths
Columbia University alumni
New York (state) lawyers
New York Supreme Court Justices
Lafayette College alumni
Missing person cases in New York City
People declared dead in absentia
Politicians from Easton, Pennsylvania
New York (state) Democrats
1930s missing person cases
20th-century American judges
20th-century American lawyers